Baluntai is a town in north-central Xinjiang Uyghur Autonomous Region of Northwest China. It borders Ke'erguti Township (克尔古提乡) on the east, Bayinbulak on the west, and Ürümqi Prefecture on the north.

Baluntai's total area is 3,020 km2, with 123,600 mu (82.4 km2) of forest and 3.2 million mu  ( km2) of pasture. It had a population of 10,521 in 2008, among which more than 75% are Mongols. Economy of Baluntai is supported by livestock breeding and tourism.

Transport
Baluntai is served by China National Highways 216 and 218, and the Southern Xinjiang Railway.

Sights
Huang Temple (aka Yong'an Temple), one of the sacred places and prestigious Lama temples for Gelug school of Buddhism, is located in Baluntai.

External links
Official site of Baluntai 

Populated places in Xinjiang